The Sayreville Energy Center, or Sayreville Cogen Facility, is a combined cycle power station in Sayreville, New Jersey owned in part and operated by NextEra Energy Resources. Built by Westinghouse, it opened in 1991. It provides power to the PJM Interconnection and the Long Island Power Authority.

See also
Red Oak (power station)
Neptune Cable
List of power stations in New Jersey

References

Power stations in Middlesex County, New Jersey
Natural gas-fired power stations in New Jersey
Sayreville, New Jersey
New York (state) infrastructure
1991 establishments in New Jersey
Energy infrastructure completed in 1991
NextEra Energy